Frederick William Ramsden (11 January 1911 – 12 March 1989) was an English-born Scottish first-class cricketer.

Ramsden was born at Leeds in January 1911 and was educated in Scotland at Paisley Grammar School. A club cricketer for Ferguslie Cricket Club, Ramsden made his debut for Scotland in first-class cricket against Ireland at Belfast in 1937. He made two further first-class appearances in 1937, against the touring New Zealanders at Glasgow, and Yorkshire at Harrogate as part of Scotland's tour of England. Two years later, he made his final first-class appearance for Scotland against Ireland at Dublin. In his four matches, he scored 108 runs at an average of 13.50, with a highest score of 29. A bank manager by profession, Ramsden died in March 1989 at Largs, Ayrshire.

References

External links

1911 births
1989 deaths
Cricketers from Leeds
Scottish people of English descent
People educated at Paisley Grammar School
Scottish cricketers